Frantzia is a genus of the gourd family, Cucurbitaceae containing around 6 species of herbaceous climbers with tuberous roots. All members grow in forest and secondary scrub in Central America where tacaco (Frantzia tacaco) is a widely cultivated vegetable.

Description
Frantzia species can reach several meters long. Flowers are small and monoecious with male flowers produced in racemes and female flowers either solitary or in groups of 2-5. Leaves are simple, long-petiolate, with palmately lobed or angulate blade.

Taxonomy
The accepted species according to the Catalogue of Life are:
 Frantzia panamensis Wunderlin
 Frantzia pittieri (Cogn.) Pittier
 Frantzia tacaco (Pittier) Wunderlin
 Frantzia talamancensis Wunderlin
 Frantzia venosa L. D. Gómez
 Frantzia villosa Wunderlin

Frantzia is placed in the Sicyoeae tribe.

Phylogenetics
Frantzia is sister to the Echinopepon genus within the Sicyoeae tribe. Phylogenetic studies suggest these relationships:

References

Cucurbitoideae
Cucurbitaceae genera